Kachari is a Sino-Tibetan language  of the Boro-Garo subgroup, spoken in Assam, India. With fewer than 60,000 speakers recorded in 1997, and the Asam 2001 Census reporting a literacy rate of 81% the Kachari language is currently ranked as threatened. Kachari is closely related to surrounding languages, including Tiwa, Rābhā, Hajong, Kochi and Mechi.

While there are still living adult speakers, many children are not learning Kachari as their primary language, instead being assimilated into the wider Assamese speaking communities.
 Some alternative names are Boro, Bara, Cachari, Plains Kachari and Hill Kachari.
 Geographic distribution: Kachari is spoken in 16 villages total in North Cachar Hills district, Assam, and Dimapur and Dhansiri administrative circles of Kohima district, Nagaland.

Division 
According to LSI, Kachari language was divided into Plain Kachari or Bårå(Boro) and Hill Kachari or Dimasa.

Phonology

Consonants 
Kachari consists of the 13 consonants shown below and three Non-syllabics,(Frictional: h, frictionless palatal: y, frictionless rounded velar: w) :

Vowels

Prosody 
 Tone
 Kachari is a tonal language, consisting of 4 tones high, mid, low and neutral (1, 2, 3, 0)

Grammar

Syntax

The word order of Kachari is Subject-Object-Verb (SOV). 
 Kachari uses many instances of "compound words" to denote meaning. For example, the word for "boy", is really the combination of the Kachari words for "male" and "child". This also correlates with Kachari verbs, which can be agglutinated to form "compound verbs". While Kachari is not polysynthetic, its verbs act as a stem for descriptive adjective, adverbs or affixes to change its meaning. For example, the "conjugation of the regular verb active, 'nu-nǔ.' to see" results in the following:

Tense

Future Tense 
As can be seen from the chart above, the future tense is indicated with -gan, while -si- indicates that the future event will occur soon or in the near future. One example is "Bí faigan", he will come, as opposed to "Bí faisigan", he will come (almost at once) or he is about to come.

Present Tense

Present tense is shown through three affixes, "ǔ", "dong" and "gô". The first two forms represent indefinite and definite forms and are far more common that "gô", which is frequently only used to answer questions in the affirmative.

Adjectives 
Most adjectives can be added both before or after the noun it is describing, though it gains the case ending if it follows the noun, rather than precedes it. This follows the identification of as a strongly suffixing language. However, this classification goes against Konwar's description of Kachari and a related language, Karbi, as primarily prefixing to create adjectives.

Numerical adjectives are always inserted after the noun it is describing. For example, "ten goats" is "Burmá má-zǔ" with "Burmá" meaning goat, "má" being the classifier for "animal" and the number ten being "zǔ".

Morphology 
Gender  - Common nouns such as father, mother, brother or sister have distinct masculine and feminine words while other nouns including animals, will typically have the words for male and female, -jelá and -jeu respectively, added on as a suffix to denote gender. Other common masculine and feminine suffix forms that may be used include -zǎlá/-zǔ, -bundā/-bundi, -bóndá/-bóndi, -phántá/-phánti and -pherá/-pheri.

Number System 
Kachari has a decimal system and counts to 10 with unique words, after which the number words combine to add to the larger number as shown in the chart below.

References

Bibliography

Joseph, U.V., and Burling, Robbins. 2006. Comparative phonology of the Boro Garo languages. Mysore: Central Institute of Indian Languages Publication.
Wood, Daniel Cody. 2008. An Initial Reconstruction of Proto-Boro-Garo. M.A. Thesis, University of Oregon.

Sal languages
Languages of Assam
Subject–object–verb languages